John Arthur Bennett (April 10, 1936 – April 13, 1961) was a U.S. Army soldier who remains the last person to be executed after a court-martial by the United States Armed Forces. The 19-year-old private was convicted of the rape and attempted murder of an 11-year-old girl in Austria. Despite last minute appeals for clemency and pleas to President John F. Kennedy by the victim and her family to spare his life, Kennedy refused; Bennett was hanged at Fort Leavenworth, Kansas in 1961.

Early life
Bennett was the fourth of eight children born to a family of sharecroppers in Chatham, Virginia. His schooling finished in the fourth grade. Despite being epileptic, he managed to enlist in the U.S. Army when he was 18.

Military career
Although he dropped out of the Ordnance Corps for academic deficiency, he became an ammunition handler and a truck driver with the U.S. Army's 11th Antiaircraft Artillery Battalion (11th AAA Battalion) at Camp Roeder near Salzburg in Austria.

Crime and court-martial
In 1954, just days before Christmas, a heavily intoxicated Bennett left Camp Roeder to find a brothel. Witnesses reported seeing him wandering around, entering random civilian homes asking for a girl (or according to some, for a woman) named Margaret or Margot. He even entered one house asking the local occupants if they had chickens. Later that evening, at Siezenheim, he met an 11-year-old girl returning from an errand for her parents. In a confession he gave to U.S. Army Military Police, he said:
I walked part way into the field with her and then I carried her the rest of the way about 25 yards. She appeared as though she wanted to go with me. The reason I carried her was because we were too near the road and I wanted to go further into the field. I sat her down in the field ... I laid down on top of her then and inserted my penis into her vagina. My penis was too big for her vagina and she started kicking. I put my hands under her buttocks and forced my penis into her vagina the rest of the way. I had intercourse with her for about 5 minutes. She screamed twice ... I didn't hit her, slap her or anything like that. After we started to have intercourse she tried to get up but she wasn't strong enough ... and I laid on top of her because I was enjoying the intercourse. I wish to state that I did not force her at all. 
Although Bennett had repeatedly raped the girl before strangling her and dumping her body in a stream, the child survived. An American officer and his wife testified that she came to their home pleading for help. She was in a disheveled state, wet and dirty, with blood on her legs. When asked what happened, she responded, "a Negro had choked me". Later, while the victim was being cleaned up, she stated that the man had taken off her underwear and stuck something in her. Bennett was arrested by MPs at the base movie theater a few hours later.

Bennett was tried at a general court-martial at the Lehener Kaserne, the former military barracks of the 59th Infantry Regiment of the Imperial-Royal Landwehr in Salzburg, on February 8, 1955. The military court heard medical testimony from a doctor who examined the victim at the officer's home, as well as another who saw her later that day at the nearby hospital. Both agreed she had been sexually assaulted.

A month later the court-martial found Bennett guilty of rape and attempted premeditated murder. He was sentenced to death. The death sentence was upheld by President Dwight D. Eisenhower on July 2, 1957.

Execution
After his sentence was stayed two times by lower courts, the U.S. District Court in Kansas overturned the rulings on appeal in 1960. On February 27, 1961, the newly appointed Secretary of the Army Elvis Jacob Stahr Jr. ordered that the sentence should be carried out. Days before Bennett's scheduled execution, the victim and her parents wrote to President John F. Kennedy, asking for clemency for Bennett. Bennett also wrote to Kennedy, asking for clemency since the girl did not die. Kennedy took no action on the appeals and let Eisenhower's death warrant stand. Bennett was hanged at United States Disciplinary Barracks at Fort Leavenworth, Kansas on April 13, 1961. His last meal consisted of cocktail sauce, hot rolls, cake, peaches, milk and coffee. Bennett's last words were "pray for me". He remains the last person to be executed following a United States Armed Forces court-martial.

See also
Capital punishment by the United States military
Capital punishment in the United States
List of most recent executions by jurisdiction
List of people executed by the United States military

Notes

References

External links
List of U.S. Military Executions  from the Death Penalty information Center

1936 births
1961 deaths
20th-century executions by the United States military
20th-century executions of American people
African-American United States Army personnel
American male criminals
American people convicted of attempted murder
American people convicted of rape
American people convicted of child sexual abuse
Criminals from Virginia
Executed African-American people
Executed people from Virginia
People executed by the United States military by hanging
People executed for rape
People from Chatham, Virginia
People with epilepsy
United States Army personnel who were court-martialed
United States Army soldiers
20th-century African-American people